"The Immigrant" is a 1975 single written by Neil Sedaka and Phil Cody and performed by Sedaka. The single was the second release from his album, Sedaka's Back. "The Immigrant" was dedicated to John Lennon and the immigration problems that he faced. The single peaked at number 22 on the Billboard Hot 100 and spent one week at number one on the Easy Listening chart in May 1975.

Sedaka has referred to "The Immigrant" as his most controversial song and the only time he ever publicly waded into politics as a performer.  According to Philip Cody, the song's lyric writer, it was originally written as a tribute to his father, Anthony Feliciotto, who came to America from Sicily in 1930.  Sedaka's parents had also emigrated, from Russia/Poland. Lennon responded favorably, stating that Sedaka and other songwriters in his Brooklyn neighborhood were among "the greatest songwriters in the world;" Sedaka joked that there must have been "something in the egg cream."

Chart history

See also
List of number-one adult contemporary singles of 1975 (U.S.)

References

1975 singles
Neil Sedaka songs
Songs written by Neil Sedaka
The Rocket Record Company singles
John Lennon
1975 songs
Songs with lyrics by Phil Cody